Danyang East railway station, was called Linkou railway station, is a reserved railway station of Shanghai-Nanjing Intercity Railway located in Jiangsu, People's Republic of China. Currently it's a freight station of Beijing-Shanghai railway, as well as its passenger services closed in 2003.

References

Railway stations in Jiangsu